Lady Canning's Seat is major tourist spot in Coonoor, The Nilgiris, Tamil Nadu. It is  situated 9 km from the township Coonoor. The site is named after Countess Charlotte Canning.

See also
 Coonoor
 Nilgiri mountains
 Catherine Falls
 Lamb's Rock
 Sim's Park
 Droog Fort
 Dolphin's Nose
 Katary Falls
 (Ralliah dam)

References

Tourist attractions in Nilgiris district
Coonoor